Suvarna Sundari is a 1957 Indian Telugu-language swashbuckler film directed by Vedantam Raghavayya. It stars Akkineni Nageswara Rao, Anjali Devi with music composed by P. Adinarayana Rao. The film was produced by Adinarayana Rao under the Anjali Pictures banner.

The film was simultaneously shot in Tamil as Manaalane Mangaiyin Baakkiyam. Lata Mangeshkar suggested that Suvarna Sundari be remade in Hindi instead of dubbing the film. It was then made in Hindi with the title same as the Telugu version. Akkineni Nageswara Rao, Anjali Devi did their roles in the Hindi version as well; it was the only Hindi film in Nageswara Rao's film career, while Gemini Ganesan played the male lead in the Tamil version.

The shooting of the film was held at Venus Studios, Madras and the outdoor shooting was held at Shimsha falls, Mysore. The film was released through Chamria Talkie Distributors, headed by Sundar Lal Nahata, and it set a record at the box office by celebrating 50 days in 48 centres and completed 100 days in 18 centres.

Plot 
Once upon a time, there was a kingdom Malwa, it's prince Jayanth is ready to leave, after accomplishing his education. Just before, Rajaguru's daughter Sarala denounces him for the refusal of her love and claims that he molested her. So, King Chandra Bhanu penalises him with the death penalty but Jayanth absconds somehow. On the way, he is acquainted with 3 sly thieves Kailasam, Ullasam, and Chadastam who confront Jayanth to resolve the mystery behind a Lord Siva’s temple. Therein, Jayanth relieves the curse of a Gandharva who bestows him with 3 marvel gifts. A Jug which supplies any amount of food, a Mat which travels anywhere, and a Wand which punishes a person irrespective of his strength. Meanwhile, the 3 crafty thieves backstab Jayanth and, steals the objects. They share the 3 objects among themselves and split.

Before long, fortuitously, a glorious angel Surana Sundari lands from heaven and comes across Jayanth. The two fall in love. They marry and Sundari conceives. When Lord Indra knows about Sundari's affair with a mortal man, he curses Sundari to take a permanent human form and casts her to Earth. He also curses that Jayanth will lose all her memory and will turn into stone if she touches him. Jayanth wanders, and Sundari becomes a mortal on earth and gives birth to a baby boy. But the wheel of fortune makes them separate. Years roll by, and Jayanth as a wanderer regains 3 objects from the thieves who cheated him earlier. In between, he contracts a curse that he will turn into a female in the day and a male in the night. The curse will be lifted only if one gets Amrit the nectar from heaven. Thereafter, he goes into a kingdom and lands a job at the palace in the female form of Jayanthi, getting close to the princess Parthima Devi.

In the meantime, Sundari uses a man's guide to search for his son and Jayanth. Sundari gets appointed as Chief Minister by the King. Simultaneously, their son Siva Kumara is raised by a cowherd, after his death, he sets foot in Siva temple where Lord Siva & Goddess Parvathi rears him with her breast milk. By fate, one-night Parthima encounters Jayanth and falls for him. Sundari sees that and renounces Jayanth and feels it's better for him as there is also Indra's curse. Later, Jayanth comes across a demon, and through it, he gets relieved from his curse. When touches Sundari he starts to become a statue due to Indra's curse and remembers his past with Sundari. At that moment, their son Siva Kumara checks them to the Shiva's temple. Thereupon, Lord Siva reveals to them that the boy is their son and for lifting Jayanth's curse the boy should pick up Golden Lotus from heaven. After making an audacious journey, the boy secures the golden lotus and reverses the curse. At last, they reunite and Jayanth is proven innocent. Finally, the movie ends on a happy note.

Cast 
 Akkineni Nageswara Rao as Jayanth
 Anjali Devi as Suvarna Sundari
 Ramana Reddy as Ullasam
 Relangi as Kailasam
 Gummadi as Tata
 C.S.R as Maharaju
 Balakrishna as Chadastham
 Peketi Sivaram as Vasanthudu
 K. V. S. Sharma as Rajaguru
 Rajasulochana as Jayanthi
 Girija as Parthima Devi
 Suryakala as Sarala
 E. V. Saroja as Goddess Parvati
 Master Babji as Siva Kumarudu
 Kanchana as Naaga Kanyaa (credited as Vasundhara)

Production 
After Paradesi (1953), the inaugural production of Anjali Pictures was an average success at the box office, its producers – husband and wife P. Adinarayana Rao and Anjali Devi – considered making their sophomore production based on folklore. The 1953 Hindi film Anarkali was a success and caught their attention, prompting them to adapt the same story in Telugu with the same title, while putting their folklore film plans on hold; it would eventually be revived as Suvarna Sundari.

Soundtrack 
Telugu version

Music composed by P. Adinarayana Rao. Adinarayana Rao, in an interview to The Indian Express in 1987, said for a song in Tamil version, he "adapted a rare composition of the famous Tanjore quartet" which prompted their sons to file a copyright violation, later Adinarayana Rao was bailed out by his friend.

Tamil version

Hindi Version 
"Kuhu Kuhu Bole Koyaliya" – Mohammed Rafi, Lata Mangeshkar
"Mujhe Na Bula Chhup Chhup" – Lata Mangeshkar
"Ram Naam Japna Paraya Maal Apna" – Mohammed Rafi
"Girija Sang Hai Shish Pe Gang Hai" – Lata Mangeshkar
"Tarana (Shastriya Sangeet)" – Lata Mangeshkar, Sudha Malhotra
"Hat Hat Hat Jaa Re Natkhat Piya" – Lata Mangeshkar, Sudha Malhotra
"Lakshmim Sheer Samudra Raj" – Ghantasala
"Chanda Se Pyare Ankhiyo Ke Taare Soja Re Maiya Ke Raaj Dular" – Manna Dey, Lata Mangeshkar
"Mausam Suhana Dil Hainz" – Lata Mangeshkar
"Sar Pe Matki Ankhiya Bhatki" – Asha Bhosle
"Shambho Sun Lo Meri Pukar" – Lata Mangeshkar
"Lelo Ji Lelo Gudiya" – Lata Mangeshkar
"Maa Maa Karta Phire Laadla" – Mohammed Rafi
"Mai Hu Pari Rasiya Ras Ki Bhari" – Lata Mangeshkar

References

External links 
 

1950s Hindi-language films
1950s multilingual films
1950s Tamil-language films
1950s Telugu-language films
1957 films
Films directed by Vedantam Raghavayya
Films scored by P. Adinarayana Rao
Indian multilingual films